Pilotless Bomber Squadron may refer to various military units for unmanned aerial vehicles (drones):
1st Pilotless Bomber Squadron, a USAF unit initially designated the First Pilotless Bomber Squadron (Light) in October 1951 
2nd Pilotless Bomber Squadron
11th Pilotless Bomber Squadron (1954-5), a USAF unit that became the 11th Tactical Missile Squadron
69th Pilotless Bomber Squadron 
Pilotless Aircraft Unit (1945-tbd), a Navy Bureau of Aeronautics unit at NAS Mojave with a detachment at Point Mugu

References 

Squadrons of the United States Air Force